This is a list of notable wildfires.

Asia

China 

Hong Kong (Special Administrative Region of China)
 1996Pat Sin Leng wildfire, Tai Po, Hong Kong; 5 hikers killed (3 pupils and 2 teachers) on 10 February.

India
2019 Bandipur forest fires
2016 Uttarakhand forest fires
2020 Uttarakhand forest fires
2021 Simlipal forest fires

Indonesia

 1997 Indonesian forest fires
 1997 Southeast Asian haze
 2005 Malaysian haze
 2006 Southeast Asian haze
 2009 Southeast Asian haze
 2010 Southeast Asian haze
 2013 Southeast Asian haze
 2015 Southeast Asian haze
 2016 Southeast Asian haze
 2019 Southeast Asian haze

Israel
1989 Mount Carmel forest fire
 1995 Jerusalem forest fire
 The 2010 Mount Carmel forest fire in Israel, Started on 2 December 2010 and burned  of forest, killing as many as 44 people, most of them Israel Prison Service officer cadets, when a bus evacuating them was trapped in flames.
22 November 2016 Haifa, Zikhron Ya'akov, Gilon wildfires
 2021 Israel wildfires

Japan
Construction workers were using fire in order to wither weeds when a strong wind moved through the area, fueling the fire; 18 firefighters were killed. The fire lasted for one day.

South Korea
 April 2000, Gangwon-do Gangneung wildfire
 March 2013, Gyeongsangbukdo Pohang wildfire.
 April 2019, Gangwon Province wildfire. The wildfire lasted three days. This massive conflagration burned  of land and destroyed over 2,000 buildings. Around thirty people were injured and the fire resulted in two deaths.

Syria
 2020 – Fires in Al-Suwayda Governorate in May, followed by Al-Hasakah Governorate in the summer, then in Latakia and Hama Governorates in September, next in Latakia again, Homs, and Tartus Governorates in October.

Arctic 

According to the WTO in June 2019 arctic wildfires emitted  of CO2. This was more than between 2010 and 2018 combined. Most carbon release was from Alaska and Siberia, but also included other arctic areas e.g. in Canada. In Siberia the temperature was about  higher in June 2019 than the average.

Europe

July 2000: Fires in Southern Europe consumed forests and buildings in southern France, parts of Iberia, Corsica, and much of Italy including the southern part: caused by the heatwave dominating southern Europe, with  temperatures
 2009 Mediterranean wildfires in France, Greece, Italy, Spain, and Turkey in July 2009

Croatia
 2007 Croatian coast fires, burning 
 Summer 2017: Croatian wildfires, a series of wildfires burning in Istria all the way down to Dalmatia. One wildfire also entered eastern suburbs of Split. The fire also affected islands of Vir, Pag and some other islands.

France 
 The 1949 Landes Forest Fire burned  of forest land and killed 82 people.
 The 1983 Forest Fire burned  of forest land and killed 239 people.

Germany
 In the fire on the Lüneburg Heath in Lower Saxony in August 1975,  of heathland burned, killing five firefighters.
 In May/June 1992 near Weißwasser (Saxony)  of forest burned. One firefighter was killed in an accident.

Greece
1985 forest fires burnt 105,000 hectares with the worst affected being around Kavala in eastern Macedonia and Thasos island in the north Aegean.
1988 forest fires burnt 110,000 hectares with the worst affected being Chios island in the east Aegean and Kefalonia in the Ionian islands.
1998 forest fires burnt 112,000 hectares with the worst at Mount Penteli near Athens
2000 forest fires in Greece were the worst forest fires to date and included the island of Samos in east Aegean and at Mount Mainalon and eastern Corinthia in the Peloponnese. The burnt area was 167,000 hectares which is the second highest in recent history (after the 2007 fires).
 2007 Greek forest fires were by far the worst fires in recent Greek history. Over 270,000 hectares were burnt mostly in the Peloponnese region (especially in Elis region) and southern Evia as well as Mount Parnitha near Athens.
 2009 Greek forest fires saw 21,000 hectares burnt around Mount Penteli near Athens.
 2018 Greek wildfires were the deadliest in recent history with over 100 deaths in and around the village of Mati near Athens.
 2021 Greek wildfires were the worst fires since 2007 with over 125,000 hectares burnt mostly in northern Evia, the Elis region of Peloponnese and around Tatoi near Athens.

Poland 
 1992: On 26 August 1992 a fire in and around Kuźnia Raciborska destroyed  of forest and killed two firefighters.
1992: On 10 August 1992 a fire on the Noteć river burned  of forest.
2020: A fire in the Biebrza National Park burned 6,000 ha of forest.

Portugal 
 August 2003 Wildfires, destroying 10% of Portuguese forests and killing 18 people
 2005 Portugal wildfires
 2016 Portugal wildfires
 June 2017 Portugal wildfires and October 2017 Portugal wildfires, catastrophic series of fires that trapped and killed more than 300 people
2018 - wildfires near the city of Portimao

Russia 
 July and August 1915 Siberian wildfires fires burned for 50 days, and burned about 14 million ha.
 1921 Mari wildfires
 August 1935 – Kursha-2 settlement was burned out with 1200 victims.
 2002 Russian wildfires
Direct carbon emissions were around 400-640 TgC.
 June – August 2010 – Drought and the hottest summer since records began in 1890 caused many devastating forest fires in European Russia.
 April 2015 – A series of wildfires in Southern Siberia killed 26 people and left thousands homeless.
 2018 Russian wildfires
 July - August 2019 Wildfires in Siberia:  were burning as of 2 August 2019 according to Russia's Federal Forestry Agency ( according to Greenpeace).
 2021 Russian wildfires

Spain
 17 July 2005 – Guadalajara province, Spain — a forest fire caused by an improperly extinguished barbecue burned  and killed 11 firefighters. 
 June 2019 -  burning near Tarragona.
 2019 Canary Islands wildfires

Turkey
 2009 Mediterranean wildfires
 2020 Turkish wildfires
 2021 Turkish wildfires
see also Forest in Turkey, Climate change in Turkey

Sweden 
 August 2014 Västmanland wildfire – Västmanland province, Sweden, a  forest fire with 1 verified death.
 Summer 2018 Sweden wildfires

Ukraine 
 Wildfire near Kreminna, 1996 — around 70 km2 (7,000 ha) 
 Wildfire in Kherson Oblast (uk), 2007 - more than 87,5 km2 (87500 ha)
 2020 Chernobyl Exclusion Zone wildfires — 470 km2 (47 000 ha)

United Kingdom
 May 2011 – Swinley Forest fire, Berkshire, England. Fire appliances from 12 counties attended over several days due to the large area of the fire. The fire service incident log for the call is over 500 pages long.
 2018 United Kingdom wildfires e.g. Saddleworth Moor fire
 2019 United Kingdom wildfires

North America

Canada and the United States 

Check out the US fire map at https://www.fireweatheravalanche.org/fire/ for more information

† Indicates a currently burning fire

Greenland 
Some wildfires occurred in Greenland in August 2017.

There was a large wildfire between Sisimiut and Kangerlussuaq from July to August 2019. It was put out by members of Beredskabsstyrelsen, who were flown in.

Oceania

Australia 

 Black Thursday bushfires of 1851 (Victoria) with 5 million hectares burnt. This record was broken in the 2019/2020 Black Summer.
 Black Friday bushfires of 1939 (Victoria) with 2 million hectares burnt.
 Black Sunday bushfires of 1955 (South Australia)
 1961 Western Australian bushfires with 1,800,000 hectares burnt.
 Black Tuesday bushfires of 1967 (Tasmania) with 260,000 hectares burnt.
 1974-75 Australian bushfire season (Queensland, New South Wales, South Australia, Western Australia)
 Ash Wednesday bushfires of 1983 (Victoria and South Australia) with 520,000 hectares burnt.
 1994 Eastern seaboard fires (New South Wales) with 800,000 hectares burnt.
 Black Christmas bushfires 2001–2002 (New South Wales) with 750,000 hectares burnt.
 Canberra bushfires of 2003

 Black Saturday bushfires of 2009 (Victoria) with 400,000 hectares burnt and the highest death toll of over 170 deaths.
 2019–20 Australian bushfire season "Black summer" - the worst bushfire season in modern Australian history. Nationwide burned (approximately) a total of 18,636,079 hectares (46,050,750 acres).

New Zealand 
 Raetihi Forest fire (Manawatu)
 2017 Port Hills fires (Canterbury)
 2019 Nelson fires

South America

Argentina 

 2008 Delta del Paraná wildfires
 2020 Delta del Paraná wildfires
 2020 Córdoba wildfires
 2022 Corrientes wildfires

Bolivia
 2002 forest fire in Bolivia
 2010 Bolivia forest fires

Brazil 

 2019 Brazil wildfires
 2020 Brazil rainforest wildfires

Chile
 2005 Torres del Paine fire
 2011–2012 Torres del Paine fire
 2014 Valparaíso wildfire
 2017 Chile wildfires
 2023 Chile wildfires – The worst in Chile's history

Ecuador
 1985 Isabela Island forest fire, Galápagos Islands, Ecuador,  lost in March.

Venezuela 
 1982 
 2020 Cagua fire

See also
 List of historic fires
 List of deadliest wildfires/bushfires
 List of largest fires of the 21st-century

References

 
Lists of wildfires